was a Japanese actor, voice actor, narrator and theatre director from Katsuyama, Fukui. He was affiliated with Aoni Production at the time of his death and was known for providing the voice of both the narrator and Professor Oak on the Japanese anime series Pokémon.

In addition to that, he regularly appeared in both the Japanese and English-language versions of the Pokémon anime, voicing Onix, Steelix and numerous other Pokémon.

Ishizuka was known for his deep, strong voice and is often cast in the role of older mature male characters, such as Jet Black from Cowboy Bebop, Eugene Gallardo from Tales of Rebirth and Captain Matthews in the Xenosaga trilogy. He was also the Japanese dub voice of Captain Gantu in every version of Lilo & Stitch to date. He was also the fourth Japanese voice of Heihachi Mishima in the Tekken video game series, and the second Japanese voice for Mr. Satan in the Dragon Ball franchise, taking over both roles since the death of longtime actor Daisuke Gōri. He has voiced the roles of Kizaru in the One Piece series, Van Hohenheim in the Fullmetal Alchemist: Brotherhood series, Zabuza Momochi in the Naruto series, Ginzo Nakamori in Detective Conan and Magic Kaito, Joseph Joestar in JoJo's Bizarre Adventure: Stardust Crusaders and JoJo's Bizarre Adventure: Diamond Is Unbreakable, as well as Bunta Fujiwara in Initial D, Ryotaro Dojima in Persona 4 and Ujiyasu Hōjō in Samurai Warriors and Warriors Orochi. Ishizuka was also the famous voice-over actor for Liam Neeson, Laurence Fishburne and Kevin Spacey.

On August 17, 2018, it was reported that Ishizuka had died on August 13, at the age of 67 from a colon infection caused by an esophageal tumor.

Filmography

Television animation
1984
Giant Gorg (Narrator)
Yoroshiku Mechadock (Toshimitsu Watanabe)

1987
Kiko Senki Dragonar (Narrator)

1988
Mashin Eiyuden Wataru (Don Girara, Don Quixote, Muko Khan)

1989
Lupin the 3rd: Bye Bye, Lady Liberty (Johns)

1990
Karakuri Kengo Den Musashi Lord (Nobunaga)

1991
Dragon Quest: Dai no Daibōken (Baran)
Yokoyama Mitsuteru Sangokushi (Zhou Yu)

1992
Lupin the 3rd: From Siberia with Love (Lucky McDonald)

1993
Kenyū Densetsu Yaiba (Raizou)
Slam Dunk (Moichi Taoka)
Lupin III: Voyage to Danger (Keith Haydon)

1994
Blue Seed (Secretary)

1995
Virtua Fighter (Wolf Hawkfield)

1996
After War Gundam X (Aimzat Kartral)
Violinist of Hamelin (Hell King Bass)
Pretty Soldier Sailor Moon Sailor Stars (Tetsurou Yoshinogawa/Sailor Chef)
Detective Conan (Souhei Tatsumi)
Rurouni Kenshin (Fuji)

1997
Virus Buster Serge (Dixon)
In the Beginning: The Bible Stories (David, Abimelech, Cyrus)
Berserk (Narrator, Void)
Battle Athletes Victory (Daizaemon Kanzaki)
Hareluya II Boy (Gouda)
Pokémon (Professor Oak, Narrator, Additional Voices)
Maze (Asterote "Aster" Reighe)
Detective Conan (Detective Nakamori)
Flame of Recca (Kuukai)

1998
Initial D (Bunta Fujiwara)
Cowboy Bebop (Jet Black)
Gasaraki (Prime Minister)
Devilman Lady (Katsumi Seta)
Trigun (Brilliant Dynamites Neon)
Yu-Gi-Oh! (Gozaburo Kaiba)

1999
Initial D: Second Stage (Bunta Fujiwara)
The Big O (Alex Rosewater)
GTO: Great Teacher Onizuka (Kizaki)
Pocket Monsters: Episode Orange Archipelago (Dr. Okido, Narrator, Additional Voices)
Pocket Monsters: Episode Gold & Silver (Dr. Okido, Narrator, Additional Voices)
Crest of the Stars (Entryus)
Tenshi ni Narumon (Yuuka)
One Piece (Kizaru, Koshiro, Kong)

2000
Vandread (Rabat)
Hajime no Ippo (Miyata's Father)
Mewtwo! I Am Here (Iwaku, Kunugidama, Narrator)

2001
Vandread: The Second Stage (Rabat)
Steel Angel Kurumi 2 (Tenkai Sumeragi)
Samurai Girl Real Bout High School (Takao Todo)
Digimon Tamers (Vajramon)
Najica Blitz Tactics (Gento Kuraku)
Hellsing (Peter Ferguson)
Mahoromatic (Narrator)

2002
Ai Yori Aoshi (Mayu's Father)
Cyborg 009 The Cyborg Soldier (Claus Van Bogoot)
Naruto (Zabuza Momochi)
Pocket Monster Side Stories (Dr. Okido, Narrator, Additional Voices)
Pocket Monsters: Advanced Generation (Dr. Okido, Narrator, Additional Voices)
Figure 17 (Desk Staff)
Mahoromatic: Something More Beautiful (Hayato Daimon)

2003
Astro Boy (Boone)
Wolf's Rain (Quent Yaiden)
Air Master (Lucha Master)
Sou Nanda (Eureka Tower)
Gad Guard (Kogoro Hachisuka)
Kaleido Star (Jerry)
Cromartie High School (Narrator)
The Big O 2 (Alex Rosewater)
Planetes (Locke Smith)
Tank Knights Portriss (File Hook)
Last Exile (Godwyn)

2004
Initial D: Fourth Stage (Bunta Fujiwara)
Diamond Daydreams (Kiichi Harada)
Kyo kara Maoh! (Stoffel von Spitzweg)
Zatch Bell! (Gustav)
Saiyuki Gunlock (Yakumo)
Samurai Champloo (Nokogiri Manzou)
Zipang (Eiichiro Taki)
Beet the Vandel Buster (Bertoz)
Monster (Narrator, Yarka)

2005
Fighting Beauty Wulong (Cao Da Hen)
Gallery Fake (Senju's Father)
Guyver: The Bioboosted Armor (Oswald . A . Lisker/Guyver II)
Eureka Seven (Britani)
Aquarion (Gen Fudou)
Black Jack (Suguru Tenma)
Minami no Shima no Chiisana Hikouki Birdy (Big Papa)

2006
ARIA The NATURAL (Gentleman)
Oban Star-Racers (Don Wei)
The Third: The Girl with the Blue Eye (Bogie)
KenIchi the Mightiest Disciple (Shio Sakaki)
NANA (Goro Komatsu)
Happy Lucky Bikkuriman (Chronos)
Pocket Monsters: Diamond & Pearl (Dr. Okido, Narrator, Additional Voices)
Yomigaeru Sora - RESCUE WINGS (Shuujirou Hongou)

2007
Mobile Suit Gundam 00 (Sergei Smirnov, Spanish Assembly Member)
Gintama (Kozenigata Heiji)
Gegege no Kitarō (Makura-Kaeshi, Tenome)
The Skull Man (Alucard van Bogeuto)
Neuro: Supernatural Detective (Yūsuke Sugita)
Moonlight Mile (Chris Jefferson, Instructor)

2008
Aria the Origination (Owner)
Kaiba (Baby)
Mobile Suit Gundam 00 Second Season (Sergei Smirnov)
Kyo kara Maoh! 3rd Series (Stoffel von Spitzweg)
Golgo 13 (Sam Cheyenne)
Stitch! (Gantu)
Birdy the Mighty: Decode (Georg Gomez)
Library War (Library Defense Force Officer)
Blassreiter (Gerd Frentzen, Shido Kasugi)

2009
Guin Saga (Marus)
Stitch!: Itazura Alien no Daibōken (Gantu)
Birdy the Mighty Decode:02 (Georg Gomez)
Naruto: Shippuden (Zabuza Momochi)
Fullmetal Alchemist: Brotherhood (Van Hohenheim)
Hajime no Ippo: New Challenger (Miyata's Father)

2010
Iron Man (Defense Minister Kuroda, Rasetsu)
House of Five Leaves (Benzou)
Stitch!: Zutto Saikō no Tomodachi (Gantu)
Strike Witches 2 (General A)
Sound of the Sky (Klaus)
Dragon Ball Kai (Mr. Satan)
Heroman (Gogol)
Pocket Monsters: Best Wishes! (Dr. Okido, Narrator, Additional Voices)
Magic Kaito (Ginzō Nakamori)
Rainbow - Nisha Rokubō no Shichinin (Higashida)

2011
Gintama' (Heiji Kozenigata)
Gosick (Jupiter Roget)
The Mystic Archives of Dantalian (Kendrick)
Chihayafuru (Dr. Harada)
Persona 4: The Animation (Ryōtarō Dōjima)

2012
Initial D: Fifth Stage (Bunta Fujiwara)
Campione! (Sasha Dejanstahl Voban)
Sankarea: Undying Love (Dan'ichirō Sanka)
Humanity Has Declined (Grandpa)
Naruto: Shippuden (Zabuza Momochi)
Stitch to Suna no Wakusei (Gantu)
Hyouka (Hanai)
Brave10 (Ieyasu Tokugawa)
Jormungand (Lehm)
Jormungand Perfect Order (Lehm)

2013
Star Blazers 2199 (Ryū Hijikata)
Attack on Titan (Mr. Leonhardt)
Unlimited Psychic Squad (Doga)
Gargantia on the Verdurous Planet (Agitator)
Chihayafuru 2 (Dr. Harada)
Tokyo Ravens (Iwao Miyachi)
Toriko (Darnil Kahn)
Neppu Kairiku Bushi Road (Sanda)
Pocket Monsters: Best Wishes! Season 2: Episode N (Dr. Okido, Narrator, Additional Voices)
Pocket Monsters: Best Wishes! Season 2: Decolora Adventure (Dr. Okido, Narrator, Additional Voices)
Pocket Monsters XY (Dr. Okido, Narrator, Additional Voices)

2014
Initial D: Final Stage (Bunta Fujiwara)
JoJo's Bizarre Adventure: Stardust Crusaders (Joseph Joestar)
Space Dandy (Dr. Gel)
Sengoku Musou SP: Sanada no Shou (Narrator)
Girl Friend Beta (Alien, Kumamoto Castle, Shiba Inu, Sea-Monkeys) (Episode 7)
Terraformars (Sylvester Asimov)
Hajime no Ippo Rising (Miyata's Father)
Black Bullet (Sōgen Saitake)
Persona 4 the Golden Animation (Ryōtarō Dōjima)
Magic Kaito 1412 (Ginzō Nakamori)

2015
Mobile Suit Gundam: Iron-Blooded Orphans (McMurdo Barriston)
Ushio & Tora (Kenichi Masaki)
Chaos Dragon (Kagraba)
Blood Blockade Battlefront (Patrick)
Dragon Ball Super (Mr. Satan)
The Asterisk War (Kouichirou Toudou) (Episode 4-6)
One-Punch Man (Carnage Kabuto) (Episode 3)
Pocket Monsters: XY&Z (Dr. Okido, Narrator, Additional Voices)

2016
Dimension W (Narrator)
JoJo's Bizarre Adventure: Diamond Is Unbreakable (Joseph Joestar)
Bakuon!! (Hayakawa) (Episode 2-12)
Berserk (Narrator)
Macross Delta (Ernest Johnson)
Pocket Monsters: Sun & Moon (Dr. Okido, Narrator, Additional Voices)
Lupin the 3rd Part IV: The Italian Adventure (Salo)

2017
ACCA: 13-ku Kansatsu-ka (Kuvarum)
Akashic Records of Bastard Magic Instructor (Burks Blaumohn)
Zero kara Hajimeru Mahō no Sho (Narrator)
Akashic Records of Bastard Magic Instructor (Parks Browmon)
Clockwork Planet (Konrad)

2018
Banana Fish ("Papa" Dino Golzine)
Sword Art Online Alternative Gun Gale Online (Narrator)
Legend of the Galactic Heroes: Die Neue These (Willibald Joachim von Merkatz)
Jūshinki Pandora (Kane Ibrahim Hasan)

Theatrical animation
Legend of the Galactic Heroes: My Conquest is the Sea of Stars  (1988) - Job Truniht
Mobile Suit Gundam: Char's Counterattack (1988) (Meran)
Legend of the Galactic Heroes: Overture to a New War (1993) - Job Truniht
Street Fighter II: The Animated Movie (1994) - Blanka
Macross Plus Movie Edition (1995) - Guld Goa Bowman  
Pokémon: The First Movie (1998) - Narrator / Gyarados / Onix / Kingler   (uncredited)
Case Closed: The Last Wizard of the Century (1999) - Detective Nakamori  
Pokémon: The Movie 2000 (1999) - Dr. Okido  
Pokémon 3: The Movie: Entei – Spell of the Unown (2000) - Dr. Ookido / Onix  
Vampire Hunter D: Bloodlust (2000) - Priest
Pokémon: Mewtwo Returns (2000) - Gyarados (uncredited)
Initial D: Third Stage (2001) - Bunta Fujiwara  
Pokémon 4Ever: Celebi – Voice of the Forest (2001) - Professor Orchid (Oak) / Onix  
Cowboy Bebop: The Movie (2001) - Jet Black
Pokémon Heroes (2002) - Narrator  
A Tree of Palme (2002) - Gaz
The Place Promised in Our Early Days (2004) - Okabe  
Detective Conan: Magician of the Silver Sky (2004) - Detective Nakamori  
Fullmetal Alchemist the Movie: Conqueror of Shamballa (2005) - Huskisson
Fist of the North Star: The Legends of the True Savior (2006) - Sôga  
Detective Conan: The Private Eyes' Requiem (2006) - Detective Nakamori  
Pokémon Ranger and the Temple of the Sea (2006) - Narrator  
Shin SOS dai Tôkyô tankentai (2007) - George  
Aquarion Movie: Ippatsu Gyakuten-hen (2007)
Sword of the Stranger (2007) - Lord Akaike  
Naruto Shippuden the Movie: Bonds (2008) - Shinnô  
Highlander: The Search for Vengeance (2008) - Doc
Redline (2009) - Colonel Volton  
Time of Eve (2010) - Katoran  
Detective Conan: The Lost Ship in the Sky (2010) - Detective Nakamori  
Pokémon: Zoroark: Master of Illusions (2010) - Narrator  
Pokémon the Movie: Black—Victini and Reshiram and White—Victini and Zekrom (2011) - Narrator  
Tekken: Blood Vengeance (2011) - Heihachi Mishima 
One Piece Film: Z (2012) - Kizaru  
Dragon Ball Z: Battle of Gods (2013) - Mr. Satan
Lupin the 3rd vs. Detective Conan: The Movie (2013) - Detective Nakamori  
Psycho-Pass: The Movie (2015) - Desmond Rutaganda  
Attack on Titan – Part 2: Wings of Freedom (2015) - Annie's Father  
Pokémon the Movie: Hoopa and the Clash of Ages (2015) - Narrator  
Detective Conan: Sunflowers of Inferno (2015) - Detective Nakamori 
Pop in Q (2016) - Elder
Pokémon the Movie: Volcanion and the Mechanical Marvel (2016) - Narrator  
Pokémon the Movie: I Choose You! (2017) - Narrator / Professor Okido  
Mazinger Z: Infinity (2017) - Dr. Hell  
Gekijoban Haikara-san ga Toru Zenpen: Benio, Hana no 17-sai (2017) - Major Hanamura  
Pokémon the Movie: The Power of Us (2018) - Narrator  
Gekijoban Haikara-san ga Toru Zenpen: Tokyo Dai Roman (2018) - Major Hanamura  
Mewtwo Strikes Back: Evolution (2019) - Narrator
My Tyrano: Together, Forever (2021)

Original video animation (OVA)
Legend of the Galactic Heroes (1988) (Job Trunicht)
Violence Jack: Hell's Wind (1990) (Violence Jack)
Vampire Hunter: The Animated Series (1997–1998) (Donovan Baine)
Hellsing Ultimate (2007) (Spirit of Hallconnen) (Ep. 3)
Mobile Suit Gundam Unicorn (2010–2014) (Meran, Yonem Kirks)
Deadman Wonderland OVA (2011) (Domon)
Attack on Titan - Lost Girls: Wall Sina, Goodbye Part. B (2018) (Mr. Leonhart)

Web animation
Xam'd: Lost Memories (2008-2009) (Ryūzō Takehara)

Video games

Tales of Phantasia (1995) (Trinicus Morrison, Edward Morrison)
Pokémon Snap (1999) (Doctor Ōkido)
Vampire Hunter D (1999) (Narrator)
Macross VF-X2 (1999) (Gilliam Angreat)
Capcom vs. SNK: Millennium Fight 2000 (2000) (Guile)
Capcom vs. SNK 2: Millionaire Fighting 2001 (2001) (Guile)
Initial D Arcade Stage (2002–2014) (Bunta Fujiwara)
Naruto: Ultimate Ninja series (Zabuza Momochi)
Naruto: Clash of Ninja series (Zabuza Momochi)
Capcom Fighting Jam (2004) (Guile)
Tales of Rebirth (2004) (Eugene Gallardo)
Radiata Stories (2005) (Gerald)
Cowboy Bebop: Tsuioku no Serenade (2005) (Jet Black)
Critical Velocity (Hartman)
Rogue Galaxy (2005) (Deego Aegis)
Ace Combat 6: Fires of Liberation (2007) (Victor Voychek)
Too Human (2008) (ODIN, Loki) (Japanese dub)
One Piece: Unlimited Cruise Episode 2: Awakening of a Hero (2009) (Kizaru)
Resistance: Retribution (2009) (Steven Cartwright) (Japanese dub)
Samurai Warriors 3 (2009) (Ujiyasu Hōjō)
The Legend of Heroes: Trails from Zero (2010) (Sergei Lou)
Chaos Rings (2010) (Olgar)
God of War: Ghost of Sparta (2010) (Thanatos) (Japanese dub)
Dance Dance Revolution series (2010–2016) (Afro)
Samurai Warriors: Chronicles (2011) (Ujiyasu Hōjō)
The Last Story (2011) (Quark)
2nd Super Robot Wars Z (2011) (Sergei Smirnov)
Dead or Alive: Dimensions (2011) (Brad Wong)
Nora to Toki no Kōbō: Kiri no Mori no Majo (2011) (Octoja Rejstrom)
Code 18 (2011) (Genkuro Kanbara)
Dragon Ball Z: Ultimate Tenkaichi (2011) (Mr. Satan)
Call of Duty: Modern Warfare 3 (2011) (Captain Price) (Japanese dub)
Musō Orochi 2 (2011) (Ujiyasu Hōjō)
Tekken 3D: Prime Edition (2012) (Heihachi Mishima)
Asura's Wrath (2012) (Augus)
PlayStation All-Stars Battle Royale (2012) (Heihachi Mishima, Andrew Ryan) (Japanese dub)
Fist of the North Star: Ken's Rage 2 (2012) (Kaioh)
Metal Gear Rising: Revengeance (2013) (Steven Armstrong)
Super Robot Wars UX (2013) (Gogorr)
Tekken Revolution (2013) (Heihachi Mishima)
Dragon's Crown (2013) (Dwarf)
Samurai Warriors 4 (2014) (Ujiyasu Hōjō)
Ryū ga Gotoku Ishin! (2014) (Yoshida Tōyō)
Granblue Fantasy (2014) (Agielba)
J-Stars Victory Vs (2014) (Heihachi Edajima)
Dragon Ball Xenoverse (2015) (Mr. Satan)
Devil's Third (2015) (Ivan)
Dragon Ball Xenoverse 2 (2016) (Mr. Satan)
Tokyo Afterschool Summoners (2017) (Captain Ahab)
The Elder Scrolls Online (2018) (Ritemaster Iachesis)
Dragalia Lost (2018) (Kleimann, Zacharias, The Doctor)

CD dramas
GetBackers (2003) (Lucifer)

Tokusatsu
Choushinsei Flashman (1986-1987) - Great Emperor Ra Deus (Ep 1 - 49)
Kyukyu Sentai GoGo Five (1999) - Corrosion Psyma Beast Jeruda (Ep 6)
Ultraman Zero Side Story: Killer the Beatstar (2011) - Beatstar
Ressha Sentai ToQger (2014) - Table Shadow (Ep 31-32)
Doubutsu Sentai Zyuohger (2016-2017) - Larry (Ep 5 - 6, 26, 37 - 38, 44 - 48)

Dubbing roles

Live-action
Liam Neeson
Taken – Bryan Mills
Unknown – Dr. Martin Harris
Battleship – Admiral Terrance Shane
Taken 2 – Bryan Mills
A Million Ways to Die in the West – Clinch Leatherwood
Non-Stop – William "Bill" Marks
A Walk Among the Tombstones – Matthew Scudder
Run All Night – Jimmy Conlon
Taken 3 – Bryan Mills
Ted 2 – Customer
The Huntsman: Winter's War – Narrator
A Monster Calls – The Monster / Conor's Grandfather
Operation Chromite – General Douglas MacArthur
Kevin Spacey
Consenting Adults – Eddy Otis
K-PAX – prot/Robert Porter
Superman Returns – Lex Luthor
Fred Claus – Clyde Archibald Northcutt
Moon – GERTY
House of Cards – Frank Underwood
Baby Driver – Doc
Laurence Fishburne
Just Cause (1997 TV Tokyo edition) – Sheriff Tanny Brown
Mystic River – Detective Sergeant Whitey Powers
Mission: Impossible III – Theodore Brassel
The Death and Life of Bobby Z – Tad Gruzsa
Man of Steel – Perry White
Ride Along – Omar
Batman v Superman: Dawn of Justice – Perry White
The 100 – Thelonious Jaha (Isaiah Washington)
All About Eve (2000 TV Tokyo edition) – Addison DeWitt (George Sanders)
American Outlaws – Allan Pinkerton (Timothy Dalton)
Arachnophobia – Dr. James Atherton (Julian Sands)
Cast Away – Stan (Nick Searcy)
City of Angels – Cassiel (Andre Braugher)
The Company You Keep – Jim Grant / Nick Sloan (Robert Redford)
Conspiracy Theory – Agent Lowry (Cylk Cozart)
Crank – Doc Miles (Dwight Yoakam)
Crank: High Voltage – Doc Miles (Dwight Yoakam)
Crimson Tide (2000 TV Asahi edition) – Lieutenant Bobby Dougherty (James Gandolfini)
The Crow (1997 TV Tokyo edition) – Grange (Tony Todd)
Day Watch – Zavulon (Viktor Verzhbitsky)
The Detonator (2009 TV Tokyo edition) – Jozef Bostanescu (Tim Dutton)
Die Hard with a Vengeance – NYPD Detective Joe Lambert (Graham Greene)
Dom Hemingway – Mr. Fontaine (Demián Bichir)
Dr. Dolittle – Dr. Gene Reiss (Richard Schiff)
Fire Down Below (2000 TV Asahi edition) – Earl Kellogg (Stephen Lang)
From the Earth to the Moon – William Anders (Robert John Burke)
Funny Face (2001 DVD edition) – Professor Emile Flostre (Michel Auclair)
Galaxy Quest – Alexander Dane (Alan Rickman)
Ghostbusters – Mayor Bradley (Andy García)
Gone Girl – Tanner Bolt (Tyler Perry)
The Green Mile – Brutus "Brutal" Howell (David Morse)
Hackers – The Plague / Eugene Belford (Fisher Stevens)
High Fidelity – Ian Raymond (Tim Robbins)
Hot Shots! Part Deux – Dexter Hayman (Rowan Atkinson)
The Horse Whisperer – Robert MacLean (Sam Neill)
In the Name of the King – Norick (Ron Perlman)
Internal Affairs – Sergeant Raymond Avilla (Andy García)
Jennifer 8 – Sgt. John Berlin (Andy García)
Journey to the End of the Night – Sinatra (Scott Glenn)
Judge Dredd – Rico Dredd (Armand Assante)
Land of the Lost – Enik (John Boylan)
Lara Croft: Tomb Raider – The Cradle of Life – Jonathan Reiss (Ciarán Hinds)
Leap of Faith – Jonas Nightengale (Steve Martin)
Licence to Kill (1999 TV Asahi edition) – Professor Joe Butcher (Wayne Newton)
A Little Chaos – King Louis XIV (Alan Rickman)
Man on a Ledge – Jackie "Jack" Dougherty (Edward Burns)
The Matrix Reloaded – Commander Lock (Harry Lennix)
The Matrix Revolutions – Commander Lock (Harry Lennix)
Moonraker – Hugo Drax (Michael Lonsdale)
Near Dark – Severen (Bill Paxton)
Night Watch – Zavulon (Viktor Verzhbitsky)
Nineteen Eighty-Four – Big Brother
Nixon – Alexander Haig (Powers Boothe)
The Order – Driscoll (Peter Weller)
Payback – Val Resnick (Gregg Henry)
Penny Dreadful – Malcolm Murray (Timothy Dalton)
Percy Jackson: Sea of Monsters – Kronos (Robert Knepper)
The Poseidon Adventure (2016 BS-TBS edition) – The Reverend Frank Scott (Gene Hackman)
Prince of Persia: The Sands of Time – Sheik Amar (Alfred Molina)
Scarface (2004 DVD edition) – Alejandro Sosa (Paul Shenar)
She-Wolf of London – Fergus (John Hallam)
The Sorcerer's Apprentice – Maxim Horvath (Alfred Molina)
Speed 2: Cruise Control – Juliano (Temuera Morrison)
The Taking of Pelham 123 – Walter Garber (Denzel Washington)
Taxi – Daniel Morales (Samy Naceri)
The Thieves – Chen (Simon Yam)
The Thin Red Line – Capt. Charles Bosche (George Clooney)
Titanic – Brock Lovett (Bill Paxton)
Tootsie (25th Anniversary DVD edition) – Ron Carlisle (Dabney Coleman)
The Vow – Bill Thornton (Sam Neill)
The West Wing – Josh Lyman (Bradley Whitford)
Whiskey Tango Foxtrot – Ali Massoud Sadiq (Alfred Molina)
X-Men Origins: Wolverine – Victor Creed (Liev Schreiber)

Animation
Batman: The Animated Series (H.A.R.D.A.C.) (1st Time)
Beware the Batman (Tobias Whale)
Chicken Little (Mr. Woolensworth)
Cloudy with a Chance of Meatballs (Mayor Shelbourne)
Ice Age: The Meltdown (Lone Gunslinger Vulture)
Ice Age: A Mammoth Christmas (Diego)
Ice Age: Continental Drift (Diego)
Ice Age: Collision Course (Diego)
Isle of Dogs (Narrator)
Lilo & Stitch (Captain Gantu)
Lilo & Stitch: The Series (Captain Gantu)
Leroy & Stitch (Captain Gantu)
Mr. Bogus (Additional Voices)
Shrek 2 (Prince Charming)
Shrek the Third (Prince Charming)
Sing (Big Daddy)
Stitch! The Movie (Captain Gantu)
SWAT Kats: The Radical Squadron (Jonny K.)
Thunderbirds Are Go (The Hood)
Transformers: Prime (Leland "Silas" Bishop)
Widget (Bob and Additional Voices)
Wreck-It Ralph (General Hologram)

References

External links
Official agency profile 
Unshō Ishizuka at GamePlaza-Haruka Voice Acting Database 
Unshō Ishizuka at Hitoshi Doi's Seiyuu Database 

1951 births
2018 deaths
Aoni Production voice actors
Deaths from esophageal cancer
Deaths from cancer in Japan
Japanese male stage actors
Japanese male video game actors
Japanese male voice actors
Male voice actors from Fukui Prefecture
20th-century Japanese male actors
21st-century Japanese male actors